Chlorolestes elegans is a species of damselfly in the family Synlestidae. It is found in Botswana, Malawi, Mozambique, South Africa, and Zimbabwe. Its natural habitats are subtropical or tropical moist montane forests and rivers. It is threatened by habitat loss.

References

External links

 Chlorolestes elegans  on African Dragonflies and Damselflies Online

Odonata of Africa
Insects of South Africa
Synlestidae
Insects described in 1950
Taxonomy articles created by Polbot